Darayan II (also called Darius II; Aramaic: 𐡃𐡀𐡓𐡉𐡅 d’ryw) was king of Persis in the 1st century BC, a vassal state of the Parthian Empire. He was succeeded by his son Ardakhshir II.

In the silver drachmas of Darayan II, on the obverse, the king is wearing a tiara with a crescent and star symbol, earflap, and decorated with precious stones. On the reverse, the king is facing a fire altar & holding a scepter, with an inscription in Aramaic d’ryw mlk' brh wtprdt mlk’ ("Darius the King, son of Wadfradad the King").

References

Sources 
 .
 
 
 
 

Year of death unknown
Year of birth unknown
1st-century BC rulers in Asia
1st-century BC Iranian people
Zoroastrian rulers
Kings of Persis